The Canton of Saint-Sever-Calvados (French: Le canton de Saint-Sever-Calvados) is a French former canton of the département of Calvados in the region of Basse-Normandie. It had 7,226 inhabitants (2012). It was disbanded following the French canton reorganisation which came into effect in March 2015. It consisted of 18 communes, which joined the canton of Vire Normandie in 2015. The canton formed part of the Arrondissement of Vire. The chief commune in the Canton was Saint-Sever-Calvados and the general counciller was Yves Rondel (2008 - 2014)

Geography 

The altitude varied from 39 m (Pont-Farcy) to 351 m (Le Gast), the average altitude was 186 m.

Communes 
The Canton comprised the following Communes:

 Beaumesnil
 Campagnolles
 Champ-du-Boult
 Courson
 Fontenermont
 Le Gast
 Landelles-et-Coupigny
 Le Mesnil-Benoist
 Le Mesnil-Caussois
 Mesnil-Clinchamps
 Le Mesnil-Robert
 Pont-Bellanger
 Pont-Farcy
 Saint-Aubin-des-Bois
 Saint-Manvieu-Bocage
 Sainte-Marie-Outre-l'Eau
 Saint-Sever-Calvados
 Sept-Frères

References

Former cantons of Calvados (department)
2015 disestablishments in France
States and territories disestablished in 2015